The Dallas Symphony Orchestra (DSO) is an American orchestra based in Dallas, Texas. Its principal performing venue is the Morton H. Meyerson Symphony Center in the Arts District of downtown Dallas.

History
The orchestra traces its origins to a concert given by a group of forty musicians in 1900 with conductor Hans Kreissig. It continued to perform and grow in numbers and stature, so that in 1945 it was in a position to appoint Antal Doráti as music director. Under Doráti, the orchestra became fully professional. Several times during the history of the orchestra it has suspended operations, including periods during the First and Second World Wars from 1914 to 1918 and from 1942 to 1945, and more recently in 1974 due to fiscal restraints. Subsequent music directors have included Georg Solti, Anshel Brusilow, and Eduardo Mata. Andrew Litton was music director from 1994 to 2006.  During Litton's tenure, the orchestra recorded the four Rachmaninoff piano concerti and the Rhapsody on a Theme of Paganini with Stephen Hough for Hyperion Records.

In 2007, Jaap van Zweden was named the DSO's 15th music director, and began his tenure in the 2008–2009 season with an initial contract of four years.  In October 2009, the orchestra announced the extension of van Zweden's contract through the 2015–2016 season.  In November 2013, the orchestra announced a further extension of van Zweden's contract through 2019.  In January 2016, the orchestra announced the rescheduled conclusion of van Zweden's tenure as music director after the 2017–2018 season, after which time he was scheduled to serve as the orchestra's conductor laureate from 2018 through 2021.

In 2002, Fabio Luisi first guest-conducted the orchestra.  His next Dallas guest-conducting appearance was in March 2018.  On the basis of this guest-conducting engagement, in June 2018, the orchestra named Luisi its next music director, effective with the 2020-2021 season.  He held the title of music director-designate in the 2019-2020 season.  In January 2021, the orchestra announced the extension of Luisi's contract as music director through 2029.

The current president and chief executive officer of the orchestra is Kim Noltemy.  In October 2018, the orchestra announced the appointment of Gemma New as its next principal guest conductor, the first female conductor to hold the title, effective with the 2019-2020 season. She was reappointed to this position for the 2022–2023 season.

Music directors

 Hans Kreissig (1900–1901)
 Walter Fried (1911)
 Carl Venth (1911–1914)
 Walter Fried (1918–1924)
 Paul van Katwijk (1925–1936)
 Jacques Singer (1937–1942)

 Antal Doráti (1945–1949)
 Walter Hendl (1949–1958)
 Paul Kletzki (1958–1961)
 Georg Solti (1961–1962)
 Donald Johanos (1962–1970)
 Anshel Brusilow (1970–1973)

 Max Rudolf (1973–1974)
 Eduardo Mata (1977–1993)
 Andrew Litton (1994–2006)
 Jaap van Zweden (2008–2018)
 Fabio Luisi (2020–present)

Musicians
Members of the Dallas Symphony Orchestra with articles in English Wikipedia include:
Ryan Anthony, trumpet 2004–2020, principal 2006–2020
Lev Aronson, cello 1948–1967, principal 1949–1967
Madeleine Begun, oboe c. 1969–1970
Emanuel Borok, violin, concertmaster 1985–2010
Margaret Brouwer, violin
Rafael Druian, violin, concertmaster 1947–1949
Willard Somers Elliot, bassoon 1951–1964, principal 1956–1964
Jules Eskin, cello 1948–1949
Walter Fried, violin, concertmaster 1911–1914 (also Music Director)
Richard Giangiulio, trumpet, principal 1969–2001
Everett M. Gilmore, tuba, principal, 1965–1995
Joseph Hawthorne, viola, principal 1945–1949 (also associate conductor)
Frank Kaderabek, trumpet, principal 1953–1958
Alexander Kerr, violin, concertmaster 2011–present
David Kim, violin, senior associate concertmaster 1997–1999
William Kraft, percussion 1954–1955
Andreas Makris, violin, principal second 1958–1959
Demarre McGill, flute, principal 2013–2016
Mitchell Peters, percussion, principal c. 1959–1969
Robert Xavier Rodriguez, Composer in Residence 1982–1983
David Shifrin, clarinet, principal 1970s
János Starker, cello, principal 1948–1949
Carl Venth, violin, concertmaster 1927–1931 (also Music Director)
Ernst Wallfisch, viola, assistant principal 1947–1949
Harold Wright, clarinet, principal 1952–mid-1950s?

References

External links
 Official website of the Dallas Symphony Orchestra
 Official website of the Dallas Symphony Chorus
 School of Music Program Book 1969-1970. North Texas State University. School of Music. School of Music Program Book 1969-1970. Denton, Texas. UNT Digital Library]

Music of Dallas
Texas classical music
Musical groups established in 1900
Wikipedia requested audio of orchestras
1900 establishments in Texas
Orchestras based in Texas
Symphony orchestras